Ooij may refer to:

Places in the province of Gelderland, the Netherlands:
 Ooij, Berg en Dal, in the municipality of Berg en Dal
 Ooij, Neder-Betuwe, in the municipality of Neder-Betuwe
 Ooij, Zevenaar, in the municipality of Zevenaar